Tityus silvestris is a species of arachnid endemic to northern South America.

Description 
It is one of the smallest species in the Buthidae family, growing to a maximum from 25 to 45 mm, has a yellowish body, with several dark spots, while the tail and the télson are darker. This species has sexual dysmorphism. This species occurs in northern South America, in French Guiana and Brazil (Amazonas and Para), living in tropical forests. It is believed to feed on crickets and cockroaches.

Medical significance 
Before it was believed that this species was not responsible for serious accidents, however, a 39-year-old man was stung by this species and arrived at the hospital in three hours, with only pain and paraesthesia, but in two hours later, he had difficulty in breathing, tachycardia, hypertension and muscle spasms, the condition became more serious, the patient was hospitalized, being discharged seven days later, this makes T. silvestris a kind of medical importance.

References 

silvestris